The social and legal situation of women in Uzbekistan has been influenced by local traditions, religion, the earlier Soviet regime and changing social norms since independence.

Maternal healthcare and availability of contraceptives
The availability of contraceptives and maternal healthcare is mixed. 62.3% of women were using free contraceptives in 2003. However, the UN estimates that about 13.7% of women in Uzbekistan who would like to prevent, or delay, their next pregnancy are unable to do so because of limited access to contraceptives. In 2000, there were approximately 20,900 midwives in the country.

Forced sterilization

There are reports that forced sterilization of women is practiced in Uzbekistan. A BBC World Service "Assignment" report on 12 April 2012 uncovered evidence that women are being sterilised, often without their knowledge, in an effort by the government to control the population.

Suicide
Self-immolation is a common form of suicide among women in Uzbekistan. In 2001 it was estimated that approximately 500 women a year kill themselves because of abusive situations.

Trafficking
The UN has recognized some efforts of the government to curtail human trafficking. For example, telephone hotlines are available for trafficking victims, and trafficking carries a jail sentence of five to eight years.

However, trafficking still persists, as Uzbekistan is both a supplier and consumer of trafficked women.”Trafficking occurs as an extension of the ‘shuttle’ trade. The women are sent as tourists with promises of employment as nannies, tutors or baby-sitters, but they often end up working in the sex industry.”

Women’s economic opportunities
"Gender roles in the economy changed during the Soviet period and continue to change in independence." While the Uzbek state has programs in place to help increase economic opportunities for women, there are persistent problems. For example, the labor market is sex-segregated, and women are usually paid lower wages. "Unskilled personnel in the non-production sector are comprised virtually entirely of women.” Women also cannot be used for night time or overtime work. As of 2003 there was no known law against sexual harassment.

Mothers with disabled children or many children can retire at 50, which is up to five years earlier than the stipulated retirement age (55).

Women’s legal rights and government representation
As of 2004 Uzbekistan’s election law requires political parties to nominate at least 30 percent female candidates for the parliament. However, the underrepresentation of women is endemic at all levels of government.

Uzbekistan has universal suffrage; however, "according to data from surveys conducted by the Public Opinion Centre, 64% of urban and 50% of rural women consider that men have greater opportunities for implementing their rights in the political sphere".

Forced marriage and bride kidnapping
Forced marriage through bride kidnapping occurs in parts of the country, especially Karakalpakstan.  Bride kidnappings are believed to be tied to economic instability. Whereas weddings can be prohibitively expensive, kidnappings avoid both the cost of the ceremony and any bride price. Some scholars report that less desirable males with inferior educations or drug or alcohol problems are more likely to kidnap their brides.

References

 
Uzbekistan